Arjestan (also Romanized as Arjestān and Arjastān) is a village in the Sabalan District of Sareyn County, Ardabil Province, Iran. At the 2006 census, its population was 293 in 62 families.

References 

Tageo

Towns and villages in Sareyn County